{{Infobox company 
|name   = Aberdeen Journals Ltd 
|logo   = 
|type   = Private 
|company_slogan = 
|foundation     = September 1928 
|location       = Aberdeen, Scotland, UK
|key_people     = 
|num_employees  = 
|industry       = Publishing and printing of newspapers 
|products       = Aberdeen CitizenEvening ExpressScot-AdsThe Press and Journal
|revenue        = 
|divisions      = 
|homepage       = 
}}

Aberdeen Journals Ltd. is a newspaper publisher based in Aberdeen, Scotland.

The company publishes the Press and Journal, the Evening Express, the Aberdeen Citizen and Scot-Ads newspapers.  It was owned by Northcliffe Newspapers Group, which is owned by Daily Mail & General Trust from 1995 until 2006, when Aberdeen Journals was sold to Dundee based D. C. Thomson & Co. Ltd.The Press and Journal was first published as a weekly title on 29 December 1747 and was known as The Aberdeen's Journal.

It was published on a weekly basis for 128 years until August 1876, when it became a daily newspaper.  In November 1922, the paper was renamed The Aberdeen Press & Journal when its parent firm joined forces with the Free Press.  The Press & Journal, often called the P&J, is a daily morning regional newspaper.  It is printed 6 days a week as a compact. The Press & Journal produces 6 geographic editions.

Daily readership – 138,000  
Weekly readership – 287,000  
Circulation – 67,781 (July-Dec 2011, 99,1% paid)

The current editor of the Press and Journal is Frank O’Donnell.

The Evening Express is a daily local evening newspaper which was first published in November 1879.

The current editor of the Evening Express'' is Craig Walker.

References

Mass media companies of Scotland
Companies based in Aberdeen
Privately held companies of Scotland